The Loyal Temperance Legion was the children's branch of the Woman's Christian Temperance Union (WCTU).  Its slogan was "Tremble, King Alcohol, We Shall Grow Up".  It published an English-language newspaper for children called The Young Crusader, which was edited for some time by WCTU president Anna Adams Gordon, a strong believer in the need to interest children in temperance at a very early age.

Notable people
 Suessa Baldridge Blaine (1860-1932), general secretary of the Loyal Temperance Legion
 Harriet Ball Dunlap (1867-1957), State secretary of the Loyal Temperance Legion of West Washington WCTU
 Anna Adams Gordon (1853–1931), editor, The Young Crusader
 Imogen LaChance (1853-1938), organized and superintended Senior and Junior Loyal Temperance Legion in Wisconsin
 Azuma Moriya (1884–1975), head, Loyal Temperance Legion program in Japan

References

External links
 https://books.google.com/books?id=BuzNzm-x0l8C&pg=PA387&lpg=PA387&dq=Loyal+Temperance+Legion&source=bl&ots=zwbEfei_an&sig=i46roe3Aq6UO2ARQqPELl8qm9hc&hl=en&sa=X&ei=I-BcVamwPIH6UP-PgNAB&ved=0CDMQ6AEwAw#v=onepage&q=Loyal%20Temperance%20Legion&f=false
 https://books.google.com/books?id=EMjxAAAAMAAJ&q=Loyal+Temperance+Legion&dq=Loyal+Temperance+Legion&hl=en&sa=X&ei=sOBcVYvTFYLWUb3wgNgN&ved=0CB8Q6AEwADgK

Temperance organizations in the United States
Youth organizations based in the United States